The 1938 Delaware Fightin' Blue Hens football team was an American football team that represented the University of Delaware in the 1938 college football season. In their first season under head coach Stephen Grenda, the Blue Hens compiled a 3–5 record and were outscored by a total of 164 to 70. The team played its home games at Frazer Field in Newark, Delaware.

Schedule

References

Delaware
Delaware Fightin' Blue Hens football seasons
Delaware Fightin' Blue Hens football